VMD may refer to:

 Vector meson dominance, in physics a model describing the hadron photoproduction process
 Versatile Multilayer Disc, a discontinued high-capacity optical disc technology
 The academic degree bestowed upon a Veterinary Medical Doctor or (colloquially) a veterinarian by a University—e.g. 'Jane Smith, VMD.' 
 The VMD degree (Veterinariae Medicinae Doctoris) is the equivalent of the DVM degree conferred by The University of Pennsylvania
 Veterinary Medicines Directorate, a UK government agency regulating veterinary medicines
 Victoria Machinery Depot, a western Canadian shipyard and heavy equipment manufacturer
 Video Marc Dorcel, a French production company of pornographic films
 Virtual Microscopy Database, an online database of virtual microscopy image files for histology and pathology researchers and educators
 Visual Molecular Dynamics, a molecular modelling and visualization computer program
 Vocaloid Motion Data, a kinematics export format of MikuMikuDance